Goodooga Airport  is located  west of Goodooga, New South Wales, Australia.

See also
List of airports in New South Wales

References

Airports in New South Wales